The 2012–13 Vanderbilt Commodores Men's Basketball Team represented Vanderbilt University in the 2012–13 college basketball season. The team's head coach was Kevin Stallings, in his fourteenth season at Vanderbilt. The team plays their home games at Memorial Gymnasium in Nashville, Tennessee, as a member of the Southeastern Conference.

Previous season
After a 21–10 regular season that fell short of lofty preseason expectations, the Commodores captured their first SEC tournament championship in 61 seasons on March 11, 2012, by defeating top-ranked Kentucky in the SEC Tournament finals. The Commodores advanced to their third consecutive NCAA tournament where they defeated Harvard in the second round before falling the third round to Wisconsin to finish the season 25–11.

Departures
Vanderbilt suffered devastating personnel losses after the 2011–12 season; of their six leading scorers, five graduated and the other declared for the 2012 NBA Draft. In all, the Commodores lost 88.1% of their scoring from 2011–12. Also, the Commodores' returning players had started a total of three games in the 2011–12 season. Of the 14 SEC teams in the 2012–13 season, Vanderbilt was one of only three that did not return a player who averaged double figures in points in the previous season, and the only team that returned fewer starts was Kentucky, which did not return a single player who had started a game in 2011–12.

In addition, for the second straight offseason, a Vanderbilt assistant accepted a Division I head coaching position. In the 2011 offseason, King Rice left to become the head coach at Monmouth. This offseason, Dan Muller returned to his alma mater of Illinois State. Stallings chose not to hire a new assistant. Previously, he had rotated the administrative role of director of basketball operations among his assistants. This season, he named former Commodores player Dan Cage as director of basketball operations and removed that role from his assistants.

Roster

Schedule

|-
!colspan=12| Exhibition

|-
!colspan=12| Non-Conference Regular Season

|-
!colspan=12| SEC Regular Season

|-
!colspan=12| 2013 SEC tournament

|-
| colspan="12" | *Non-Conference Game. Rankings from AP poll. All times are in Central Time.
|}

References

Vanderbilt
Vanderbilt Commodores men's basketball seasons
Vanderbilt Commodores men's basketball
Vanderbilt Commodores men's basketball